These are the results of 2017 BWF World Senior Championships' 45+ events.

Men's singles

Seeds
 Wu Chang-jun (champion, gold medal)
 Carsten Loesch (final, silver medal)
 Tamas Gebhard (third round)
 Ulf Svensson (semifinals, bronze medal)
 Justin G. Andrews (third round)
 Kiran Vinayakrao Makode (quarterfinals)
 Stefan Edvardsson (quarterfinals)
 Magnus Gustafsson (quarterfinals)

Finals

Top half

Section 1

Section 2

Bottom half

Section 3

Section 4

Women's singles

Seeds
 Gondáné Fórián Csilla (champion, gold medal)
 Dorota Grzejdak (final, silver medal)

Group A

Group B

Group C

Group D

Finals

Men's doubles

Seeds
 Wattana Ampunsuwan / Naruthum Surakkhaka (second round)
 Chatchai Boonmee / Wittaya Panomchai (champions, gold medal)
 Venkataraju Akula / B. V. S. K. Lingeswara Rao (quarterfinals)
 Justin G. Andrews /  Vadim Nazarov (second round)

Finals

Top half

Section 1

Section 2

Bottom half

Section 3

Section 4

Women's doubles

Seeds
 Tracey Middleton / Joanne Muggeridge (champions, gold medal)
 Jana Dudek /  Dorota Grzejdak (quarterfinals)

Group A

Group B

Group C

Group D

Finals

Mixed doubles

Seeds
 Nick Ponting / Julie Bradbury (champions, gold medal)
 Patrik Bjorkler /  Gondáné Fórián Csilla (final, silver medal)
 Justin G. Andrews / Betty Blair (quarterfinals)
 Brian Tim Juul Jensen /  Caroline Hale (quarterfinals)

Finals

Top half

Section 1

Section 2

Bottom half

Section 3

Section 4

References

Men's singles
Results

Women's singles
Group A Results
Group B Results
Group C Results
Group D Results
Finals Results

Men's doubles
Results

Women's doubles
Group A Results
Group B Results
Group C Results
Group D Results
Finals Results

Mixed doubles
Results

2017 BWF World Senior Championships